Geoffrey Osch (born 2 May 1994) is a Luxembourgian alpine ski racer.

He competed at the 2015 World Championships in Beaver Creek, USA, in the giant slalom.

References

External links

1994 births
Luxembourgian male alpine skiers
Living people
Place of birth missing (living people)